The Vienna Danube regulation refers to extensive flood-control engineering along the Danube river in Vienna, Austria during the last 150 years.  The first major dams or levees were built during 1870-75. Another major project was constructed during 1972-88, which created the New Danube and Danube Island (Donauinsel). Prior to regulation, the Danube in Vienna had been an 8-kilometre (5 mi) wide wetlands, as a patchwork of numerous streams meandering through the area (see maps).

History
In Vienna, the Danube river up until 1870, was almost totally unregulated. The river flowed through wetlands on the left (east) bank of today's Danube course. Villages like Jedlesee, Floridsdorf and Stadlau that were near the former main branch of the Danube were particularly susceptible to flooding.

After repeated severe flooding, in 1810 Hofbau-Direktor Josef von Schemerl proposed regulating the river by creating a new river bed, but his plans were not realized. 

From 1870 to 1875 the Danube was regulated for the first time. Additional major floods in the years 1897, 1899 and 1954, especially concerning the right bank of the Danube at Handelskai ("Trade pier"), proved that this 1875 regulation of the Danube was insufficient.

In 1972, after several years of study, a new flood-control project was started. The material excavated from the channel was placed between the Danube and the channel, creating the Danube Island. This channel, the New Danube, is protected by fortifications and is only used to divert flood waters. The Danube Island and the New Danube now serve as a popular recreation area.

Flood years and levels
Major floods in Vienna were:

See also

A series of articles on regulation of the Danube in chronological order
Internationalization of the Danube River, for events from earliest times to the Treaty of Paris in 1856
Commissions of the Danube River, for the international bodies governing the waterway from 1856 to 1940
Nazi rule over the Danube River
Danube River Conference of 1948
Danube Commission, for events since 1948
International Commission for the Protection of the Danube River, for the organization established in 1998 and charged with environmental and ecological activities

Notes

External links
 ORF ON Science - "An der schönen blauen Donau"
 stadt-wien.at - Die Große Regulierung

Vienna Danube regulation
Danube
River regulation